Lex Hives is the fifth full-length album by Swedish rock band The Hives. The album was released on 1 June 2012 in Sweden, and internationally from 4 June 2012.

Lex Hives was self-produced by The Hives and mixed by Grammy Award winner Andrew Scheps (Red Hot Chili Peppers, Adele), with two additional tracks mixed by D. Sardy (Marilyn Manson, Slayer) and Joe Zook (Weezer, Modest Mouse). The deluxe version features bonus tracks (digital download only) produced by Queens of the Stone Age frontman Josh Homme.

The term "Lex Hives" is a phrase derived from the ancient Roman practice of enacting a system or body of laws and accepting them as a standard.

It became the last album from the band to feature bassist Dr. Matt Destruction as he left due to health reasons in late 2013 and was replaced by Randy bassist Johan Gustafsson, under the stage name The Johan and Only.

Background
After recording two albums (Tyrannosaurus Hives, The Black and White Album) for the Universal Music Group's Interscope label, the band did not want to extend the deal, and so the band found themselves as free agents. The Hives responded by going independent for their fifth album. Lex Hives was self-funded and self-produced, and has been issued on the band's own Disques Hives imprint.

As for why the band took five years between albums, frontman Howlin' Pelle Almqvist noted the group toured for nearly three years after The Black and White Album, but added that self-producing an album with a five-piece band is not the quickest of ways to reach a consensus. "We thought it would be faster if we produced it ourselves as opposed to scheduling it with someone who’s busy 24-7, 365 days per year," Almqvist said. "Rather than squeeze in some studio time, we could go into the studio whenever we wanted. It turns out that having five producers who have an equal say of everything isn’t that fast. You’d think we could have guessed that in advance."

For promotion, The Hives initiated a contest on social networking website Facebook on 23 March 2012. A news update on their official website revealed the song titles on 12 tracks however they were purposely jumbled up. Fans had to post their guesses as to what they thought the tracks were called on the band's official Facebook page. It stated that the first person to unscramble all the song titles correctly would "receive a phone call from The Hives." The band announced the grand prize winner and 17 runners-up on their Facebook page on 6 April 2012.

Reception
The album debuted at number 7 on the Swedish chart, 20 on the Swiss chart, 38 on the Austrian chart, 38 on the Australian chart and 53 on the Canadian Albums Chart.

The album received generally favorable reviews from critics.

Track listing

Notes

1. Both bonus tracks (13, 14) are cover songs, but are directly related to one of The Hives' members in some way. "High School Shuffle" is a cover of an Alex Carole and The Crush song that was produced by Chris Dangerous (drums). "Insane" is a cover of The Dragtones' original, and Vigilante Carlstroem (guitar) is a member of that band.
2. "Go Right Ahead" has songwriting also credited to Jeff Lynne since the band got permission to include a similar riff to Electric Light Orchestra's "Don't Bring Me Down".

Personnel
The Hives
 Howlin' Pelle Almqvist – vocals, vocoder
 Nicholaus Arson – lead guitar, backing vocals
 Vigilante Carlstroem – rhythm guitar, backing vocals
 Dr. Matt Destruction – bass guitar
 Chris Dangerous – drums

Additional musicians and personnel
 Gustav Bendt – saxophone
 Per Ruskträsk Johansson – saxophone
 Jonas Kullhammar – saxophone
 Henrik Alsér  engineer
 Michael Ilbert – engineer
 Karl Larsson – engineer
 Dagge Lundquist – engineer
 Johan Gustavsson – engineer
 Kalle Gustavsson – engineer
 Justin Smith – engineer
 Janne Hansson – engineer
 Linn Fijal – assistant engineer
 Jeff Lynne – composer
 Stephen Marcussen – mastering
 Andrew Scheps – mixing
 Joe Zook – mixing

Charts

References

2012 albums
The Hives albums
Self-released albums